was a Japanese astrophotographer and astronomer. PBS has described him as "the world's foremost wide-angle astrophotographer".

Fujii graduated from Tama Art University in 1961, and began working at observatories, producing a substantial bibliography of general-audience astronomy books. In 1974, Fujii began Japan's first star party, the "Invitation to Starlit Skies", which he hosted on Mount Azuma until 1984.

Fujii's work is marketed by David Malin; he collaborated with Serge Brunier in the production of 2001's Great Atlas of the Stars.

The main-belt asteroid 3872 Akirafujii is named in his honor.

Fujii died on 28 December 2022, at the age of 81.

References

External links 
 David Ratledge analyzes the "Akira Fujii effect", at Deep-Sky.co.uk

1941 births
2022 deaths
20th-century Japanese astronomers
21st-century Japanese astronomers
People from Yamaguchi Prefecture
Astrophotographers
20th-century Japanese photographers
21st-century Japanese photographers